Edmond Elbridge Good (July 1, 1910 – September 22, 1991) was a 20th-century Canadian illustrator, writer and co-author of more than a dozen comics during the Golden Age of Comic Books.

Biography

Early life
Born in Saco, Maine, Good's parents were both Canadian and returned to their home town of Hamilton Ontario when Edmond was 10. Ed showed a keen interest in art at an early age, and excelled at drawing in high school. After graduation Good's father, a seasonal fisherman, insisted his son continue his education and paid for his tuition at the Hamilton school of art and design. Upon graduation Edmond went to work as a commercial illustrator before making his debut in comics for Bell Features, a comic strip syndicate owned by Cy Bell in 1941. His only marriage was to Audrey Harrison whom he wed in June 1936, the couple had two children together Aledra and Barton.

Comic industry 
After shadowing artists on various titles at Bell Features, Cy Bell impressed with Ed's work ethic and natural affinity toward color theory and good design, promoted Good to Art Director. A year later in 1942, the comic industry continued to suffer through anemic sales on traditional titles and Bell hired Adrian Dingle (Triumph Comics, No. 7 May/June 1942) to replace Good as director.

One of Good's earliest contributions to the ten cent cover was a male character he helped develop named Rex Baxter; the series was one of the longest running of the Canadian Sign/Bell Features titles. During this time Good simultaneously moonlighted for various publishers, mainly pulp fiction titles such as Thrilling Detective Stories. Other notable titles Good either co-authored or created under Bell were Dagar Desert Hawk, Sky Ranger, Ghost Breaker and Magnet.

Near the end of 1943, Edmond relocated to upstate New York, settling in at a position for Adventure Comics and as a splash page/cover artist for Thrilling Comics in what would be considered his most notable role as a professional artist for the AP Newsfeatures stripScorchy Smith.

In 1955 Good left his position at AP Features to start his own comic agency Good Comics which produced Johnny Law and Sky Ranger, both of which were met with poor commercial success.

Jerry Bails Who's Who In Comics listed Good as Art director of Tupperware Incorporated until his retirement in 1974, he was known to frequent Comic Cons in the East U.S. well into his late seventies.

Published works

References 

Canadian comics artists
Canadian illustrators
Golden Age comics creators
Artists from Ontario
Canadian expatriates in the United States
1910 births
1991 deaths